Airat Rafailovich Ichmouratov (Tatar Cyrillic:  Айрат Рафаил улы Ишмурат,) born 28 June 1973) is a Volga Tatar born Russian / Canadian composer , conductor and klezmer clarinetist. He is conductor and composer in residence of Longueuil Symphony Orchestra, clarinetist of Montreal-based Klezmer group Kleztory and invited professor at Laval University in Quebec, Canada. On 21 October 2020 Airat Ichmouratov received Charles Biddle Award. This honour, given by Ministry of Immigration, Francisation and Integration, and Culture pour tous  highlights the contributions of immigrants to Quebec whose personal and professional commitment contributes to the province’s cultural and artistic development.

Early life
Ichmouratov was born and raised in Kazan, the capital and largest city of the Republic of Tatarstan, Russia, he is second child of Razima Icmouratova (Gatina) and Rafail Ichmouratov.
He studied Clarinet at the Kazan Music School N3, Kazan Music College and Kazan Conservatory, graduating in 1996. In 1993, when he was appointed as Associate clarinetist of the Tatarstan's Opera and Ballet Theatre, and of the Kazan State Symphony Orchestra, he began to extensively tour in Europe. 
In 1997, Ichmouratov went to Canada to participate as student at Orford Art's Centre Festival, where he met Yuli Turovsky,  cellist and conductor, who later became his close mentor.

Career 
In 1998, Ichmouratov permanently moved to Montreal, Quebec, Canada, where he obtained a Master degree at the University of Montreal, where he studied with Andre Moisan. He then founded the Muczynski Trio with Luo Di -Cello and Evgenia Kirjner on piano, which won 1st prize and the Grand Award at the National Music Festival (Canada, 2002) and 1st Prize at the 8th International Chamber Music Competition in Kraków (Poland, 2004).

Conductor
Ichmouratov's first conducting job, after obtaining his Doctorate degree in Orchestra Conducting at University of Montreal (2005) was with chamber orchestra Les Violons du Roy in Quebec City, where he was assistant conductor of renown specialist in Baroque and Classical repertoire, Canadian conductor Bernard Labadie. Les Violons du Roy's Concert on 5 December 2008 "Russian Impressions" under Ichmouratov's direction, also presented the world premiere of his own Cello Concerto, won the Opus Prize in the category – Best concert of the Year.  Airat was appointed to the position of Resident Conductor of the Quebec Symphony Orchestra from 2009 until 2011, where he was assisting Israeli conductor and composer Yoav Talmi. In 2011, replacing Yuli Turovsky at short notice, Ichmouratov conducted I Musici de Montréal Chamber Orchestra on tour in USA, Brazil and Peru. In October 2011 he made his debut with Tatarstan Academic State Opera and Ballet Theatre (Russia) and was immediately re invited to conduct Puccini's Turandot and Verdi's Rigoletto during the 2012–13 season and on the following European Tour.

Kleztory

In 2000, Mr. Ichmouratov joined the klezmer group Kleztory, in which he presently plays the clarinet, composes and arranges. In 2004, Kleztory recorded for the Chandos Records (Great Britain) CD with I Musici de Montréal Chamber Orchestra and Yuli Turovsky. In 2007 Kleztory's album "Nomade" won the Opus Prize. Most recent (2014) Album "Arrival" was nominated as Best album of the year in Traditional music category by ADISQ. In 2012 Kleztory won klezmer Furth Prize at International Klezmer festival and Competition in Amsterdam and as result appeared at Furth Klezmer Festival during the following spring
. With Kleztory, Mr. Ichmouratov has appeared as soloist with several orchestras including the Montreal Symphony Orchestra, the Quebec Symphony Orchestra, I Musici de Montréal Chamber Orchestra, Les Violons du Roy and Brussels Chamber Orchestra and toured intensively in Canada, USA, Brazil, Mexico, Costa Rica, Germany, the Netherlands, Austria, Romania and China.

Composer
The music of Airat Ichmouratov has been performed by a wide range of ensembles and musicians in countries around the world, including Maxim Vengerov, Yannick Nézet-Séguin, Jonathan Crow, Andrew Wan, Eric Paetkau, Alexis Hauser, Jean Francois Rivest, Alexandre Da Costa , Alain Trudel, Stephane Laforest, Andre Moisan, Mark Simons, Yegor Dyachkov, Max Pollak, Stéphane Tétreault, Sasha Mirkovic & ensemble Metamorphosis (Serbia), Quebec Symphony Orchestra, Orchestre Métropolitain, Taipei Symphony Orchestra, Amadeus Chamber Orchestra of Polish Radio, Les Violons du Roy, Orchestra London, Longueuil Symphony Orchestra, New Orford String Quartet, Yuli Turovsky & I Musici de Montreal, 13 Strings (Ottawa), Tatarstan State Symphony Orchestra (Russia), La Primavera Chamber Orchestra, Alcan Quartet, Molinari Quartet, Orford Camerata Ensemble, Sinfonia Toronto, Nouvelle Generation Chamber orchestra just to name a few.

Ichmouratov was named as Resident Composer 2012 at Concerts aux îles du Bic (Canada), in 2013 Composer of Summer at Orford Arts Centre (Canada) and in 2015 Summer Composer at 17e édition of Festival Classique des Hautes-Laurentides (Canada). Since 2010 Ichmouratov is Associate Composer with Canadian Music Centre.

Discography
 Klezmer music, Kleztory (2002)
 Barber, Copland, Britten, Bruch, Kazan Chamber Orchestra La Primavera, Ak Bars (2002)
 Klezmer, Kleztory, Yuli Turovsky & I Musici de Montreal Chamber Orchestra, Chandos Records(2004)
 Nomade, Kleztory, Opus Award winner 2007, Amerix (2007)
 Shostakovich,Weinberg,Ichmouratov, I Musici de Montreal Chamber Orchestra, Analekta (2008)
 Symphonique, Le Vent du Nord et Quebec Symphony Orchestra, CBC (2010)
 Carte Postale, Alcan Quartet, ATMA Classique (2011) 
 Beethoven, Violin Concerto (cadenzas by Ichmouratov), Symphony No. 7, Alexandre Da Costa, Taipei Symphony Orchestra, Warner Classics (2013)
 Arrival, Kleztory, Amerix (2014)
 Tales from the Dinarides, Michael Bridge, Guillaume Tardif, Kornel Wolak, Wirth Institute (2017)
 Klezmer Dreams, Andre Moisan, Jean Saulnier and Molinari Quartet,ATMA Classique (2017)
 Nigun, Kleztory, Amerix (2017)
 Melodies of Nations, Romic – Moynihan Duo, Hedone Records (2017)
Letter From an Unknown Woman, Three Romances for Viola, Concerto Grosso No. 1 – Belarusian State Chamber Orchestra, Evgeny Bushkov – Chandos (2019)
Youth' Overture, Maslenitsa Overture, Symphony, Op.55 'On the Ruins of an Ancient Fort' – Orchestre de la Francophonie, Jean-Philippe Tremblay – Chandos (2020)
 Momentum, Kleztory - Chandos (2020)

List of compositions

Orchestra
 Symphony Nº1 Op.55 "On the ruins of ancient Fort" (2017)
 David of Sassoon - Symphonic Fantasy after Armenian epos Op.11 (2006)
 Overture Halloweenesque Op.21 (2009)
 Overture Ville Cosmopolite Op.29 (2012)
 Overture Maslenitsa Op.36 (2013)
 Overture Youth  Op.50 (2016)
 Overture Peter the Great Op.62 (2019)
 Overture The Myth of Falcon Op.65 (2020)
 Overture Koliada Op.67 (2020)
 Overture The Bewitched Canoe Op.70 (2021)

Concerti with orchestra
 Concerto for Viola N1 with Symphony Orchestra No1 Op.7 (2004)  
 Concerto for Viola N2 with String Orchestra and harpsichord (in Baroque style) Op.41 (2015)
 Concerto for Oboe and Strings with Percussions Op.6 (2004)
 Concerto for Flute and Symphony Orchestra Op.64 (2020)
 Concerto for Cello N1 with String Orchestra and percussion Op.18 (2009)
 Concerto for Cello N2 with Symphony Orchestra and percussion Op.57 (2018)
 Concerto for Piano and Orchestra Op 40 (2014)
 Double Concerto for Violin and Cello Op.66 with Strings, Piano and Percussion (2020)
 Concerto grosso N1 Op.28 for Clarinet, Violin, Viola, Cello, Piano and String Orchestra with Percussion (2011)
 Concerto grosso N2 Op.60 for Violin, Flute (recorder)and Harp with String Orchestra (2018)
 Concerto grosso N3 Op.68 "Liechtenstein" for 2 Violins,Viola, Cello and String Orchestra (2021)
 Fantasy for Viola and Orchestra on D.Shostakovich's opera "Lady Macbeth of Mtsensk District" Op.12 (2006)
 3 Romances for Viola and Strings with Harp Op.22 (2009)
 Capriccio Rustico for Cello and Orchestra Op.26  (2010)
 The Ride of Cello Vello Buffon for Cello with Orchestra Op.27 (2010)
 Fantastic Dances for Clarinet, Cello and Piano with Strings and Percussion Op.15 (2007) 
 The Final Procession for Clarinet, Cello and Piano with Strings and Percussion Op.37 (2013)
 The Arrival to the City for Clarinet, Cello and Piano with Strings and Percussion Op.38 (2013)
 Shabarsha for Tap Dancer and String Orchestra Op.39 (2013)
 Elegy for Violin and String Orchestra Op.32 (2012)
 Adagio and Allegro con brio for Violin and String Orchestra Op.43 (2015)
 Windcatcher for Clarinet and String Orchestra Op.17  (2008)  
 Fantasia on klezmer themes No.1 Op.13 (2006)
 Sarasatiana Op.20 for 5 Violins and String Orchestra (2009)

Chamber music
 Trio "Tales from the Dinarides", Op 48 for Violin, Clarinet, and Accordion (2016)
 Trio for Clarinet, Viola and Piano Op.61 (2019)
 Trio for Harp, Viola and Flute "Fujin's Dream" Op.58(2018)
 String Quartet No. 1 Op.1 (2003)
 String Quartet No.2 Op.5 / Chamber Symphony N2 for String Orchestra Op.5A  (2009)
 String Quartet No. 3 Op.25  / Chamber Symphony N3 for String Orchestra Op.25A (2010)
 String Quartet N4 Op.35  / Chamber Symphony N4 for String Orchestra Op.35A  (2013)
 Woodwind Quintet Op.63 (2019)
 12 Preludes for woodwind Quintet Op.8  (2005) 
 Sonata for Clarinet and Piano "The Bells"  Op.9 (2005)
 Two pieces Viola and Piano Op.10  (2005)
 Fantasia on klezmer themes No.2 Op.16 for Clarinet, Piano and String Quartet (2008)
 Largo for Sanja for Oboe and Piano Op.46
 One day of an almost ordinary life for Clarinet and String Quartet Op.47 / Clarinet and String Orchestra Op.47A (2015)
 String Octet "Letter from an Unknown Woman" Op.56 after Stefan Zweig's novella "Letter from an Unknown Woman"

Vocal
 3 poems after Alexandre Pushkin Op.34 for soprano and Chamber Orchestra (2012)

Music for children
 Variations on Children's Theme Op.23 for Strings and Harp (2010)
 The Sorcerer's Hat Op.24 music tale, based on story by Tove Jansson (2010)
 Chamber Suite from "The Sorcerer's Hat" Op.24 A (2010)
 "Shuburchunchiki " Op.19  (2010)
 Music tale "When land became Water", with Puppet Theater and Chamber Orchestra after Neeta Premchand's book (2019)
 Giraffe Op.48 or String Orchestra (2016)
 Music tale "Shabarsha" for Tap Dancer and String Orchestra Op.39 (2013)
 “Ares” the god of War, Op.59 a piece for youth orchestra (2019)

Violin solo
 Klezmer Cadenzas for Beethoven Violin Concerto Op.33 (2012)

Cello solo
 Praeludium in G major Op.69 (2021)

Piano solo
6 Preludes for Piano Op.44 (2015)

Klezmer
 Jew in Rio for klezmer band Op.2  (2000)
 Bolero for klezmer band Op.3  (2000)
 The song of the Dead Sea for klezmer band Op.4 (2006)
 Clarinet Doina For clarinet, klezmer band and with Symphony Orchestra Op.30 (2012)
 Gut Yontev For klezmer band and Symphony Orchestra Op.31 (2012)

movie
Music for movie Master of Silence Op.14 (2006)

Personal life
Ichmouratov is married to violist and violinist Elvira Misbakhova, and they have two daughters.

See also
 Documentary Film "Ascent" about Airat Ichmouratov on TV channel Russia-1 Tatarstan 
 Interview with Airat Ichmouratov on  Airelibre.tv 
 Interview with Airat Ichmouratov on  Global News Montreal

References

External links
Official website
the Longueuil Symphony Orchestra
Kleztory klezmer group
Canadian Music Centre 

Russian composers
Russian male composers
Canadian composers
Canadian male composers
Klezmer musicians
Tatar people
1973 births
Living people
Université de Montréal alumni
21st-century Russian conductors (music)
Russian male conductors (music)
21st-century Russian male musicians
21st-century Canadian male musicians